The 2019 Canoe Marathon European Championships took place between 25 and 28 July 2019 at Decize, France. The competition consisted of twenty-one events – twelve in kayak and nine in canoe – shared between junior, under-23 and senior categories.

Medalists

Seniors

Under 23

Juniors

Medal table

References

External links
 
 Results site

Canoe Marathon European Championships
Canoe Marathon European Championships
International sports competitions hosted by France
Marathon European Championships
Canoeing in France
July 2019 sports events in Europe